Ellis is an unincorporated community in Scott Township, Steuben County, in the U.S. state of Indiana.

History
A post office was established at Ellis in 1888, and remained in operation until it was discontinued in 1903.

Geography

References

Unincorporated communities in Steuben County, Indiana
Unincorporated communities in Indiana